Karl Feoder Sim, also known as Carl Feoder Goldie (6 December 1923 – 21 October 2013) was a New Zealand art forger, and the only person convicted of that crime in New Zealand.

Early life 
Sim was born in Mangaweka in the Manawatū-Whanganui region, and attended Oroua Downs School. His artistic talents were discovered at Palmerston North Technical School, where from the age of 14 he learned under H. Linley Richardson. Richardson had him learn by copying other artists, including old masters and Charles F Goldie. Sim later worked as a "well diviner," choosing the best place to dig a well, in the Manawatu in the 1950s. He also used his artistic skills working as a signwriter.

Forgery 
Sim noticed his art from school being auctioned off as originals of other artists, and from there started forging on purpose. He would forge artists such as Frances Hodgkins, Colin McCahon, and Charles F Goldie, He started selling forged paintings and drawings in his 40s, out of his antique and wine shop in Foxton. By selling the artwork through his shop, it created provenance, bolstering the claim of authenticity. By signing the artist's name on the pictures, he sold them as original, genuine pieces of art. He even managed to sell off a van Dyck for around $600. Eventually the amount of art coming out of his shop raised suspicions, and the police raided it and arrested him in 1985. Sim had gotten caught with spelling mistakes in some signatures, specifically with van der Velden forgeries where he capitalized the v in van, as well as signing one painting "Veldon." He was convicted of 40 counts of forgery and sentenced to 200 hours community service and a fine of $1,000. Afterward he changed his name to Carl Feoder Goldie, so he could legally sign his work as CF Goldie. Following his conviction he continued to forge art, using associates to sell his forgeries through auction houses in New Zealand, Australia and the United Kingdom until shortly before his death. He was responsible for a set of six forged artworks attributed to Paul Gauguin displayed at an Auckland exhibition in 2000. Though one auctioneer claims his fakes were obvious and wouldn't fool experts since he used the same techniques and pigments in his forgeries.

Later life 
Sim was guest of honor at the inaugural 'Mangaweka Fakes & Forgeries Festival' held in 2007 in his birth town. He appeared again as prize presenter in 2011 at the now two yearly event, and was planned to appear at the 2013 event in November, before his death in October of that year. In 2007, he was named the 8th greatest art forger in the world.

He wrote a book in 2003, called Good As Goldie, later republished as C F Goldie and the Creative Art of Forgery.

He died on 21 October 2013 at North Shore Hospital, Auckland, New Zealand. A couple purchased his old flat and turned it in an antique shop named Goldie's Junk 'N Disorderly to keep his legacy alive.

References

Further reading
 
 

1923 births
2013 deaths
New Zealand artists
Art forgers
People from Foxton, New Zealand
People from Mangaweka